Otto Baird Price (September 16, 1877 – January 18, 1947) was a dentist and political figure in New Brunswick, Canada. He represented the City of Moncton in the Legislative Assembly of New Brunswick from 1912 to 1920 and Westmorland in the House of Commons of Canada from 1925 to 1935 as a Unionist and Conservative member.

He was born in Petitcodiac, New Brunswick, the son of Warren W. Price and Helena Crandall. In 1904, he married Clare B. Sibler. Price ran unsuccessfully for a seat in the House of Commons in 1917 and 1921. He was defeated in a bid for reelection in 1935.

Electoral record 

By-election: on Mr. Copp's appointment as Secretary of State of Canada:

|- 
  
|Liberal
|Arthur Bliss Copp 
|align="right"|acclaimed

References 
 
 Canadian Parliamentary Guide, 1926, AL Normandin

1877 births
1947 deaths
Conservative Party of Canada (1867–1942) MPs
Members of the House of Commons of Canada from New Brunswick
Progressive Conservative Party of New Brunswick MLAs
People from Westmorland County, New Brunswick